= AutoBidsOnline =

American car buying & research website

- Company type: Subsidiary of DJ Automotive Information Services, Inc.
- Founded: 1999
- Headquarters: Dallas, Texas
- Website: AutoBidsOnline.com
- Advertising: No
- Launched: April, 2009

AutoBidsOnline is a research portal and online car buying site based in Dallas, Texas. It allows consumers to research new car prices, compare new cars for sale and bid for the price of their new car online. The company also provides lead generation and referral services to auto dealers.

== History ==
AutoBidsOnline was founded by CyberCalc in 2008 shortly after conducting a national survey of new car buyers. Results of the survey indicated more than 90% of new car buyers would prefer to buy their next car online and a similar percentage considered it important to keep their personal contact information private from dealers.

The website was launched in April 2009 and quickly garnered attention from would-be new car buyers.

Current management consists of company president Jeff Cook, a noted software developer and two term Director of the Executive Board of the National Vehicle Leasing Association, COO Shannon McCaig former senior executive for Citifinancial Automotive and Director of Information Systems Mike Truscott.

On November 21, 2009, Cook and AutoBidsOnline.com were featured in an hour-long radio interview conducted my Mike Whitaker and Gary Owen at Garman Productions in Oklahoma City. Cook was the fourth entrepreneur profiled in the "Walk In My Shoes" series produced by Witaker and InBiz Radio and was posed a series of provocative questions about his career as an entrepreneur and the AutoBidsOnline.com sales model.

== Site Usage ==
AutoBidsOnline is free to the car-buying public to research new car prices, rebates, reviews and comparisons. When a consumer decides on the vehicle they would like to purchase, they may join the site as a paying member and submit an anonymous, no-obligation buy bid on the exact vehicle they desire.

The bid is then distributed to AutoBidsOnline dealer members who have the opportunity to accept, counter or reject the bid.

The first dealer to accept a bid receives the lead. The system uses a competitive bidding process for pricing and a fee-based model for dealer participation.

Once a bid has been accepted, AutoBidsOnline provides contact data to each party who are then free to arrange for finalization of the transaction.
